Smashing the Rackets is a 1938 American drama film directed by Lew Landers, written by Lionel Houser, and starring Chester Morris, Frances Mercer, Rita Johnson, Bruce Cabot and Edward Pawley. It was released on August 19, 1938, by RKO Pictures.

Plot
Jim 'Sock' Conway, former boxer and FBI hero, is maneuvered for political reasons into a do-nothing job in the district attorney's office. He considers quitting but agrees to remain in his job to defend Letty Lane in order to court her much nicer sister Pat.

Meanwhile, a gang led by White Clark and Chin Martin begins a protection racket to force local businesses to install slot machines. Chin hires Letty's boyfriend Steve Lawrence, an attorney, to file an injunction to prevent the attorney from interfering with their plans. Steve begins plotting to take over the gang from Whitey, who he finds too brutal. After Whitey orders the brutal beating of Jim's friends Franz and Otto and Otto dies, Jim uses his position to prosecute the hoodlums and is promoted. He then secures an indictment of a major racketeer.

Steve and Chin kill Whitey, and then Steve arranges for Chin to be caught in a police raid. A suspicious Letty tracks Steve to his home in country just as Chin arrives to kill Steve, and she fatally shoots him. Steve's mistress Peggy provides testimony that allows Steve to be indicted. Letty kills herself in an automobile accident in order to avoid damaging her sister's reputation. Jim and Pat are married, and he founds his own law practice.

Cast 
 Chester Morris as Jim 'Sock' Conway
 Frances Mercer as Susan 'Pat' Lane
 Rita Johnson as Letty Lane
 Bruce Cabot as Steve Lawrence
 Edward Pawley as Chin Martin
 Joe De Stefani as Franz 
 Don Douglas as Harry Spaulding
 Kay Sutton as Peggy
 Ben Welden  as Whitey Clark
 Paul Fix as Maxie
 Eddie Acuff as Joe 
 George Irving as District Attorney Edward Greer

Production 
The film was based on Forrest Davis's series of articles on Thomas E. Dewey's campaign against organized crime in New York City.

References

External links 
 
 
 
 

1938 films
American black-and-white films
RKO Pictures films
Films directed by Lew Landers
1938 drama films
American drama films
Films about organized crime in the United States
Films about lawyers
1930s English-language films
1930s American films